Japanese football in 1937.

Emperor's Cup

Births
February 13 - Hiroshi Ninomiya
March 3 - Tsukasa Hosaka
December 16 - Mitsuo Kamata

Deaths
August 7 - Takeo Wakabayashi (aged 29)

External links

 
Seasons in Japanese football